Karl Heinrich Georg Ferdinand Kreipe (5 June 1895 – 14 June 1976) was a German career soldier who served in both World War I and World War II. While leading German forces in occupied Crete in April 1944, he was abducted by British SOE officers Patrick Leigh Fermor and William Stanley Moss, with the support of the Cretan resistance.

Early life and career
Kreipe was born in 1895, the thirteenth child of a Lutheran pastor from Hanover. He fought in World War I, seeing action at the Battle of Verdun where he won an Iron Cross First Class. After the war, he joined the  Freikorps, and then the new Reichswehr in October 1919. By 1939, Kreipe had attained the rank of colonel in the Wehrmacht.

World War II
As commander of Infantry Regiment 909 of the 58th Infantry Division, Kreipe participated in the Battle of France, the drive towards Leningrad and the fighting in Kuban during Operation Barbarossa. He was awarded the Knight's Cross of the Iron Cross on 13 October 1941. Kreipe remained at the Siege of Leningrad until May 1942, when he was transferred back to Germany, where he took up administrative and teaching positions. In June to October 1943, he was returned to the Eastern Front, where he led the 79th Infantry Division. On 1 March 1944, Kreipe was appointed Commander of the 22nd Air Landing Infantry Division, operating on Crete, replacing General Friedrich-Wilhelm Müller, who had been made the German commander of Crete in Chania.

Abduction by Greek and British agents

In the spring of 1944, the Allies hatched a plan to kidnap General Müller, whose harsh repressive measures had earned him the nickname "the Butcher of Crete".  Major Patrick Leigh Fermor led the planned operation, assisted by Captain Bill Stanley Moss, Greek SOE agents and Cretan resistance fighters.  However General Müller left the island before the plan could be executed. Major Leigh Fermor decided to abduct Kreipe instead.

On the night of 26 April 1944 General Kreipe left headquarters in Archanes. The car headed without escort to a well-guarded residence, "Villa Ariadni", about 5 km outside Heraklion.  Major Leigh Fermor and Captain Moss, dressed as German military policemen, waited for him 1 km before his residence.  When he arrived, they asked the driver to stop and asked for their papers.  As soon as the car stopped, Leigh Fermor opened Kreipe's door, jumped in, and threatened him with his pistol, while Moss took the driver's seat.  (The abduction is now commemorated near Archanes.) Moss drove the kidnappers and the General for an hour and a half through 22 controlled road-blocks in Heraklion before he left Leigh Fermor to drive on and abandon the car, with material being planted that suggested their escape from the island had been made by submarine. Moss set off with the general on a cross-country march, supported by the Greek resistance, soon rejoined by Leigh Fermor. Hunted by German patrols, the kidnappers crossed the mountains to reach the southern side of the island, where a British Motor Launch (ML 842 commanded by Brian Coleman) was waiting to rendezvous.  Eventually, on 14 May 1944, they were picked up from Peristeres beach near Rhodakino and ferried to Egypt.

Kreipe was interrogated and sent to a prisoner-of-war camp in Canada. He was later transferred to a special camp in Wales.

Later life
Kreipe was finally released from British captivity in 1947. He met his kidnappers one more time in 1972 on a Greek television programme.

He died at Northeim on 14 June 1976.

In popular culture
In 1950 W. Stanley Moss, one of the leaders of the operation, wrote a bestselling account of the abduction: Ill Met by Moonlight. In the 1957 film Ill Met by Moonlight, based on the book, Kreipe is portrayed by Marius Goring.

This operation was also parodied by the BBC radio program The Goon Show with the episode "Ill Met by Goonlight".

References 

1895 births
1976 deaths
People from Schwarzburg-Sondershausen
Major generals of the German Army (Wehrmacht)
German Army personnel of World War I
Recipients of the Knight's Cross of the Iron Cross
German prisoners of war in World War II held by the United Kingdom
Crete in World War II
Reichswehr personnel
Recipients of the clasp to the Iron Cross, 1st class
Military personnel from Thuringia
German Army generals of World War II